Gary North may refer to:

Gary North (economist) (1942–2022), American Christian economic historian and publisher
Gary North (journalist), American writer and activist
Gary L. North (born 1954), United States Air Force general
Gary North (Emmerdale) a character who appeared in the British soap opera on 29 May 2014